Codroipo is a railway station serving the town of Codroipo, in the region of Friuli-Venezia Giulia, northern Italy. The station opened on 21 July 1860 and is located on the Venice–Udine railway. The train services are operated by Trenitalia.

Train services
The station is served by the following service(s):

Night train (Intercity Notte) Trieste - Udine - Venice - Padua - Bologna - Rome
Express services (Regionale Veloce) Trieste - Gorizia - Udine - Treviso - Venice
Regional services (Treno regionale) Trieste - Gorizia - Udine - Treviso - Venice

See also

History of rail transport in Italy
List of railway stations in Friuli-Venezia Giulia
Rail transport in Italy
Railway stations in Italy

References

 This article is based upon a translation of the Italian language version as of January 2016.

External links

Railway stations in Friuli-Venezia Giulia